Carolyn Allport (c. 1950 - 16 January 2017) was an Australian historian, unionist and activist.

Allport was an academic at Macquarie University for more than twenty years.

Allport was National President of the National Tertiary Education Union from 1994 to 2010 and on the executive of the Australian Council of Trade Unions for some of that time. She represented the NTEU at OECD and UNESCO fora.

Carolyn Allport Scholarship 
 2014 Julija Knezevic
 2016 Lobna Yassine

References

Australian women academics
Academic staff of Macquarie University
20th-century Australian historians
2017 deaths
Australian activists
Australian women historians
Year of birth uncertain